Patty Thompson may refer to:

Patty Thompson, a character of the Soul Eater manga and anime series
Patricia Thompson (producer) (1947–2010), American television producer and documentary filmmaker
Patty Thompson (swimmer) (born 1945), Canadian Olympic swimmer